Eddy Mazzoleni (born 29 July 1973) is a former Italian professional road bicycle racer who most recently rode for UCI ProTour Astana Team.

Biography
He currently lives in Almenno San Bartolomeo, Italy. Mazzoleni is a talented climber and was a higher finisher on the General Classification in the 2005 Tour de France, notably he finished 3rd on stage 16 to Pau. He also finished 3rd overall in the 2007 Giro d'Italia behind 1st-place winner Danilo Di Luca and 2nd place Andy Schleck. His brother in-law is Ivan Basso. Mazzoleni left Astana on 16 July 2007, following implication in the Italian Oil for Drugs case. On 8 April 2008 Mazzoleni was given a two-year suspension due to his involvement in this case.

His name was on the list of doping tests published by the French Senate on 24 July 2013 that were collected during the 1998 Tour de France and found positive for EPO when retested in 2004.

Major results

1991
 3rd  Road race, UCI Junior Road World Championships
1994
 9th Overall Giro Ciclistico d'Italia
1995
 1st Stage 7 Regio-Tour
1997
 10th Tre Valli Varesine
1998
 2nd Trofeo Laigueglia
 3rd Giro della Provincia di Reggio Calabria
1999
 3rd Giro di Lombardia
 9th Overall Regio-Tour
2000
 1st Stage 3a Tour de Romandie
 1st Stage 6 Tour de Suisse
 2nd Giro dell'Appennino
 10th Trofeo Laigueglia
2001
 2nd GP Primavera
 3rd Milano–Torino
 3rd Coppa Placci
 3rd GP Industria & Commercio di Prato
 5th Trofeo Melinda
 5th Giro dell'Emilia
 8th Giro del Lazio
 8th Giro della Provincia di Siracusa
 9th Coppa Ugo Agostoni
 9th Luk-Cup Bühl
2002
 2nd Trofeo Laigueglia
 5th GP Chiasso
 6th Overall Tour Méditerranéen
 9th Overall Tour de Romandie
2003
 6th Stausee Rundfahrt
 9th Liège–Bastogne–Liège
 10th Overall Giro d'Italia
 10th La Flèche Wallonne
 10th Giro del Veneto
2004
 2nd Milano–Torino
 2nd Klasika Primavera
 7th Giro di Lombardia
 8th Firenze–Pistoia
 9th Rund um den Henninger Turm
 10th Paris–Tours
2005
 1st Giro del Veneto
 3rd Clásica de San Sebastián
 4th Tre Valli Varesine
 9th Trofeo Melinda
2006
 9th Overall Deutschland Tour
2007
 3rd Overall Giro d'Italia

Grand Tour general classification results timeline

See also
 List of doping cases in cycling

References

1973 births
Living people
Italian male cyclists
Cyclists from Bergamo
Doping cases in cycling
Italian sportspeople in doping cases
Tour de Suisse stage winners